Dwifungsi ("dual function") was a doctrine implemented by Suharto's military-dominated New Order government in Indonesia following the removal of President Sukarno. Dwifungsi was used to justify the ABRI—especially the Indonesian Army—permanently increasing its influence in the Indonesian government, including reserved military-only seats in the parliament, and top positions in the nation's public service.

Origins 
After the 1949 transfer of sovereignty, the Army accepted civilian rule. As the weaknesses of political system became apparent, officers increasingly felt they had a responsibility to involve themselves in politics to "save the nation". When martial law was declared in 1957, the Army expanded its role into political economic and administrative areas.

Army chief-of-staff Nasution was keen to continue this after martial law lifted, and therefore developed the "Middle Way" concept in which Army would neither try to take power nor remain inactive.

From 25–31 August 1966, the Second Army Seminar was held. The attendees were senior Army officers and more than 100 participants from the Army Staff College (SESKOAD). It revised the Army doctrine, which was seen as containing too much communist influence. This new doctrine laid down the Army's non-military functions, namely "to participate in every effort and activity of the people in the field of ideology, politics and economics and the socio-cultural field"

It also produced a document entitled "The Army's Contribution of Ideas to the Ampera Cabinet". This had two parts:

 Plan for political stabilisation
 Plan for economic stabilisation

Implementation 
Through dwifungsi and the New Order political vehicle, Golkar, the ABRI (especially the army) was able to enmesh itself into all levels of Indonesian society, in a manner that reached its peak in the 1990s, but remains strong. Active ABRI officers during Suharto's presidency held key positions in all levels of government in Indonesia, including city mayors, provincial government, ambassadorships, state-owned corporations, the judiciary, and Suharto's cabinet.

During the New Order, the military had a seat in the People's Consultative Assembly (MPR) through the ABRI fraction (Fraksi ABRI). Up to 1997, the ABRI fraction consisted of 100 servicemen elected by the armed forces, but the number would later decrease to 75 after the 1997 election.

Demise 
Dwifungsi was gradually abolished following the collapse of New Order regime and the start of Reform era. At the ABRI leadership meeting in 2000, it was agreed to abolish the doctrine, which would begin after the 2004 election. All military and police officers that would like to hold political position have to leave their military career; the former President Susilo Bambang Yudhoyono was a former army officer when he was elected.

After 1999 election, 38 out of 700 members of the MPR for 1999–2004 term were from ABRI officers – which would be consists of separated military and police. Active military and police officers was removed starting with 2004–2009 term.

Notes

References

 Crouch, Harold (2007) The Army and Politics in Indonesia, Equinox, Jakarta 
 Nugroho Notosusanto (1970) The Dual Function of the Indonesian Armed Forces Especially Since 1966 Department for Defence and Security Centre for Armed Forces History Djakarta
 

Politics of Indonesia
New Order (Indonesia)